David Richard John Wootton (born 15 January 1952) is a British historian. He is Anniversary Professor of History at the University of York.
He has given the Raleigh Lecture at the British Academy (2008); the Carlyle Lectures at the University of Oxford (2014); the Benedict Lectures at Boston University (2014); and the Besterman Lecture at Oxford University (2017).

Books 
 Paolo Sarpi: Between Renaissance and Enlightenment (1983) 2002 pbk edition; (See Paolo Sarpi.)
 Bad Medicine: Doctors Doing Harm Since Hippocrates (2006)
 Galileo: Watcher of the Skies (2010) (See Galileo Galilei.)
 The Invention of Science: A New History of the Scientific Revolution (2015): finalist for the Cundill History Prize, 2016.
 Power, Pleasure, and Profit: Insatiable Appetites from Machiavelli to Madison (2018)

References

External links 
 Contributions at the London Review of Books
 Contributions at the TLS
 Interview in The Guardian about Bad Medicine and the development of medicine (April 2008)
 Machiavelli: Devil or Democrat? on Radio 4 (November 2013)
 Lecture on Galileo (January 2015)
 Besterman Lecture on Adam Smith and famine (May 2017)
 Lecture on Virtue (May 2019)
 The Fable of the Bees — In Our Time (October 2018). For numerous other appearance on In Our Time, see List of In Our Time Programmes.

1952 births
Living people
Alumni of Balliol College, Oxford
Alumni of Peterhouse, Cambridge
21st-century British historians